Fluxinella lepida is a species of extremely small deep water sea snail, a marine gastropod mollusk in the family Seguenziidae.

Description
The white, depressed shell is wider (7.30 mm) than high (3.35 mm). It is thin, highly polished and translucent nacreous.

Distribution
This marine species occurs off New Zealand at depths between 800 m and 1,000 m.

References

External links
 To Encyclopedia of Life
 To World Register of Marine Species

lepida
Gastropods described in 1983